David Bradley Hanson is a Canadian politician who was elected in the 2019 Alberta general election to represent the electoral district of Bonnyville-Cold Lake-St. Paul in the 30th Alberta Legislature. He was first elected in the 2015 election, to the 29th Alberta Legislature, for Lac La Biche-St. Paul-Two Hills, where he held the seat for the Wildrose Party after incumbent MLA Shayne Saskiw did not seek re-election.

Background 
Hanson was born in Two Hills, Alberta in either 1960 or 1961, where he spent his childhood. After graduating high school, Hanson attended Northern Alberta Institute of Technology (NAIT) in 1982, where he was qualified in plumbing, gasfitting, and steamfitting. He has since worked for various construction and oil companies, and lives on a farm outside St. Paul, Alberta.

Prior to being elected, he worked for Canadian Natural Resources Limited as a supervisor. He cites his desire to help the oil and gas field as being rooted in his own experience in the industry. He also references his two children working in the medical field as motivation for prioritizing health issues.

Political career 
Hanson served as critic for Indigenous Relations as well as Emergency Response and Disaster Preparedness for the Wildrose opposition. When the party merged with the Progressive Conservatives in 2017, he joined the new party and continued as its critic for Indigenous Relations.

Electoral history

References

1960s births
Living people
People from Two Hills, Alberta
Wildrose Party MLAs
21st-century Canadian politicians
Canadian oilmen
United Conservative Party MLAs